Game 4 Grenfell was a charity match played on 2 September 2017 to raise money for those affected by the Grenfell Tower fire, which happened three months previous. It was played at Loftus Road, which is located only a mile from Grenfell Tower. Former professional footballers, celebrities and people associated with the Grenfell Tower fire played in the match.

It was simultaneously aired live on Sky 1 and the Freeview channel Pick. The live show was presented by comedian Adam Hills, with punditry provided from fellow comedian Alan Davies and former professional footballer Ian Wright. Match commentary was provided by Joe Speight and comedian Matt Lucas, with sideline reporting by Chris Kamara.

Teams 

Team Ferdinand
Professionals
Les Ferdinand, Manager of Team Ferdinand
Marc Bircham
Paul Merson
Peter Crouch
Shay Given
Stan Collymore
Clint Hill
Clive Wilson
Damien Duff
Danny Gabbidon
David Seaman
Andy Impey

Celebrities
Ben Shephard
Chris Edwards
Chris "Woody" Wood
Damian Lewis
DJ Spoony
Iain Glen
James Bay
Marcus Mumford (c)
Mo Farah
Olly Murs
Serge Pizzorno
Tinie Tempah
Wretch 32

Individuals associated with Grenfell
Gregg Jules, firefighter
Adam Foster, firefighter
Shahin Sadafi, resident
Omar Salha, volunteer

Team Shearer
Professionals
Alan Shearer, Manager of Team Shearer
Andy Sinton
Chris Sutton
David James
Des Walker
Jamie Redknapp
Jody Morris
José Mourinho
Kevin Gallen
Trevor Sinclair (c)

Celebrities
Ben Cohen
Danny Jones
Darren Campbell
Dave
Ed Westwick
Jamie Dornan
Jarvis Cocker
Lee Mack
Paul Bullion
Ralf Little
Richard Ashcroft
Russell Howard
Steve Mackey
Tamer Hassan

Individuals associated with Grenfell
David Badillo, firefighter
Dean Smith, firefighter
Oluwaseun Talabi, resident
Bobby Ross, resident
Paul Menacer, resident

Match

Summary 
Team Ferdinand quickly took the lead through Mo Farah, who dinked the ball over goalkeeper David James. It was a somewhat lucky situation, as three Team Shearer players were simultaneously bundled over by Damian Lewis as he tried to get a shot on goal. Team Shearer would equalise twelve minutes later, when Danny Jones went on a mazy run, laying the ball off to Trevor Sinclair, who put it past David Seaman. Team Ferdinand contested the decision to let the goal stand, as they thought Sinclair was offside, but referee Mark Halsey waved their appeals away. A few minutes before half-time, both sides made a double substitution consisting of the first firefighters to arrive at Grenfell Tower; this action prompted a standing ovation from the Loftus Road crowd.

Team Shearer took the lead soon after the break, with Sinclair scoring from a direct free-kick. He took advantage of substitute goalkeeper Shay Given trying to sort out his defensive wall, and his strike left Given well beaten, ricocheting off the left hand post and into the net. Team Ferdinand's namesake Les Ferdinand came on in the second half, and almost equalised for his side, but was denied by James. Ferdinand left the pitch a few minutes later.

James himself was also substituted, making way for an unusual choice: Manchester United manager José Mourinho. Mourinho quickly became the centre of attention by getting himself booked for timewasting, and for punching away a corner from Team Ferdinand. However, Team Shearer conceded the equaliser, when Stan Collymore squared the ball to Chris Edwards, who tapped it in from close range. Mourinho was furious at his defence, particularly as he felt that Team Shearer should have had a penalty at the other end just moments before.

The match was paused on the eightieth minute in remembrance of those who lost their lives in the tower fire, and both sides made a double substitution consisting of four survivors. The match would end in a draw, and went straight to penalties (in the ABBA sequence, which had recently been implemented).

Penalty shootout 
Team Ferdinand went up first, with Grenfell resident Shahin Sadafi slotting it past Mourinho, despite the Portuguese getting a touch on it. Team Ferdinand also made a goalkeeper change, as neither Seaman or Given would face the penalty shootout, and Bastille drummer Chris Wood was selected for the shootout, having previously played in an outfield position earlier in the match. Firefighter David Badillo hammered his shot against the crossbar, but resident Oluwaseun Talabi soon levelled things up for Team Shearer. Firefighter Adam Foster, and volunteer Omar Salha, were both successful with their spot kicks. Mourinho then put his shot past Wood, and firefighter Dean Smith followed suit. Olly Murs scored the match-winning penalty, in what was a bit of karma for the Englishman, when he had been intentionally tackled by Mourinho in the 2014 edition of Soccer Aid.

After the match, Mourinho joked to Adam Hills that he had chosen the position of goalkeeper so that he did not have to run as much, and that he wanted to bring something fun and different to the charity match, given his status as a football manager. Grenfell resident Paul Menacer told the BBC: "We met people who want to talk and actually care about us. Someone as big as José Mourinho coming down and talking to us is just an amazing thing."

Match details

See also 

 1963 England v Rest of the World football match
 UEFA Celebration Match
 Match Against Poverty
 Football for Hope

References

External links 
 Official website

2017 in British television
September 2017 sports events in the United Kingdom
Charity events in the United Kingdom
Sky UK original programming
Charity football matches
Association football penalty shoot-outs
2017 in English sport